The Oldsmobile Profile was a 2000 concept car built by Oldsmobile. The Profile was a compact crossover SUV, with rear sliding doors and 5 seats. The Profile came with a supercharged 3.5 L V6 engine with 250 horsepower, all-wheel drive, and traction control. The gear selector was a dash-mounted rotary knob, freeing up the console for storage. The transmission could be shifted manually by using steering wheel-mounted buttons. A "smart card" keyless ignition system performed all personal driver adjustments including seat, radio, mirror and steering wheel when activated by the driver. Along with many other innovative features, was hands-free phone communication, Internet, on-board vehicle diagnostics and a DVD entertainment system with headrest displays for rear seat passengers.

References

Profile
All-wheel-drive vehicles
Compact sport utility vehicles
Crossover sport utility vehicles